A General View of Positivism (Discours sur l'ensemble du positivisme) is a 1844 book by the French philosopher Auguste Comte, first published in English in 1865. A founding text in the development of positivism and the discipline of sociology, the work provides a revised and full account of the theory Comte presented earlier in his multi-part The Course in Positive Philosophy (1830–1842). Comte outlines the epistemological view of positivism, provides an account of the manner by which sociology should be performed, and describes his law of three stages.

See also

Religion of humanity
Sociological positivism

References
Comte, A.; Bridges, J.H. (tr.), A General View of Positivism; Trubner and Co., 1865 (reissued by Cambridge University Press, 2009)

External links
 
 

1848 non-fiction books
Philosophy of science books
Sociology books
Positivism
Modern philosophical literature
Auguste Comte
History of sociology
Philosophy of social science
Works about philosophy of social sciences